The Utopian language is the language of the fictional land of Utopia, as described in Thomas More's Utopia. A brief sample of the constructed language is found in an addendum to More's book, written by his friend Peter Giles. Pretending to be factual, the book does not name the creator of the language; both More and Giles have been alternately credited, with Giles often thought to have designed the alphabet.

Grammar
Although some words in Utopian show different forms corresponding to different cases in the Latin translation, there is no evidence of a consistent relationship between form and meaning, as can be seen from the following comparison of the nominal, pronominal, and adjectival case forms:

There are only four verbs in the Utopian poem, and these also show no evidence of a correspondence between form and function:

Writing system

Utopian has its own 22-letter alphabet, with letters based on the shapes of the circle, square, and triangle. These correspond almost exactly to the 23-letter Roman alphabet used in the 16th century, lacking only z. The letters f, k, q, and x, though assigned Utopian equivalents, do not occur in the given text. There are several errors in the text (for example, the first word is given as utopos in Latin script, but as similar-looking stoqos in Utopian script).

Examples
The only extant text in Utopian is a quatrain written by Peter Giles in an addendum to Utopia:

It is translated literally into Latin as:

This, in turn, is translated into English as follows:
The commander Utopus made me into an island out of a non-island.I alone of all nations, without philosophy, have portrayed for mortals the philosophical city. Freely I impart my benefits; not unwillingly I accept whatever is better.

Armed with these translations, it is possible to deduce the following vocabulary:
{| class="wikitable"
|+ Vocabulary of the Utopian Language
! Utopian !! Latin !! English
|-
|agrama || ciuitatem || city (accusative; cf. Sanskrit grāmam, village)
|-
|baccan || omnium || of all
|-
|barchin || impartio || I impart
|-
|bargol || una || one, the only
|-
|boccas || dux || commander
|-
|bodamilomin || mortalibus || for the mortals
|-
|chama || insulā || from (the/an) island (ablative)
|-
|chamaan || insulam || island (accusative)
|-
|dramme || accipio || I receive
|-
|gymnosophaon || philosophiā || from philosophy (ablative)
|-
|gymnosophon || philosophicam || philosophical (accusative)
|-
|ha || me || me
|-
|he || ego || I
|-
|heman || mea || (those which are) mine
|-
|la || non || not
|-
|larembacha || expressi || I have represented (perfect)
|-
|lauoluola || grauatim || unwillingly (la + voluala)
|-
|maglomi || terrarum || of the lands
|-
|pagloni || meliora || those which are better; better things
|-
|peu || ex || from, out of
|-
|polta || fecit || (he) has made (perfect)
|-
|soma || absque || without
|-
|uoluala || libenter || freely, willingly
|-
|Vtopos || Vtopus || Utopus (mythical founder of Utopia)
|-
|}

In accordance with 16th-century typographical custom, the letters V and u are a casing pair, not distinct letters: V was the capital form and u the lower case. V~u represented a consonant or vowel depending on position, similar to y in modern English (e.g. nymph vs yellow). Analysis of the metre of the verse shows that the reader was expected to read Vtopos as 'Utopos', uoluala as 'volvala' and lauoluola as 'lavolvola'.

More's text also contains Utopian "native" terms for Utopian concepts.

References

External links
 ZX-Utopian - Free font with Utopian alphabet.

Fictional languages
1516 books
Languages attested from the 16th century
Utopian fiction